Samatya (pr. Psamatheia) is a quarter of the Fatih district of Istanbul. It is located along the Marmara Sea, and borders to the west on the neighborhood of Yedikule (the "Castle of the Seven Towers").

Etymology
The name originates from the Greek word psamathion, meaning "sandy", because of the great quantity of sand found in the quarter.

History
About 383 AD, the first monastic institution was established in Constantinople, at Psamatheia, at that time still outside the walled city.

Up to recent times, Samatya was mostly inhabited by Armenians, who were settled here in 1458 by Sultan Mehmet II, and who own there the church of Surp Kevork, also called Sulu Manastiri (Water's monastery) – previously an Eastern Orthodox church which dates back to before the Ottoman conquest, and by Greeks, who have the churches of Hristos Analipsis and Haghios Menas.

The quarter was destroyed in 1782 by one of the largest fires of Istanbul ever recorded.

Samatya today

In Samatya there is also an important public hospital, the Istanbul Educational and Research Hospital İstanbul Eğitim ve Araştırma Hastanesi.

Samatya has a station (named "Kocamustafapaşa") on the suburban railway line Sirkeci-Halkalı.

One of the most picturesque fish markets of Istanbul is placed in the quarter, just opposite the train station.

Samatya is also a favorite place for Turkish directors. One of the most famous Turkish TV shows, Ikinci Bahar ("Second Spring"), as well as Nuri Bilge Ceylan's Three Monkeys, were filmed in Samatya.

Notable personalities
Hrachia Acharian - Armenian linguist
Simon Agopyan - Armenian painter
Mihran Apikyan - Armenian writer and linguist
Sevan Bıçakçı - Turkish jeweller
Levon Larents - Armenian writer
Avedis Zildjian III - Armenian American cymbal maker

References

Sources

Quarters of Fatih